Kamal Mitra was an Indian actor who appeared in more than 90 films spanning more than four decades.  Along with Chhabi Biswas (1900–1962) and Pahari Sanyal (1906–1974) he dominated the Bengali silver screen as a character actor. Mitra played a number of prominent roles in mythological and social movies. His baritone voice and imposing physicality often saw him cast in roles of strict authoritative characters.

Personal life
Kamal Mitra was born on 9 December 1912 in Burdwan. He joined the military immediately after his graduation. Hailing from the well-known Mitra family of Barddhaman, he was a keen sportsman and a good footballer. Before making his foray into acting, he had worked in the District Magistrate & Collector's Office in Barddhaman. He was an avid reader and a collector of rare books. He donated his vast collection of books to Nandan, the centre of films, film studies and film-archive, in Kolkata. He also performed in radio-plays. His autobiography, 'Flashback', provides an insight to the world of Bengali cinema. He retired from acting in the early 1980s.

Selected filmography

  Nilangurio (1943)
  Kansa  (1944)
  Mahishasur Badh (1945)
  Abhijatri (1949)
   Sabyasachi (1977)
   Vidyasagar (1950)
  Ananda Math (1952)
  Jighansa (1951)
   Agnipariksha (1954)
  Shap Mochan (1955)
  Silpi (1956)
  Saat Number Bari (1946)
  Badhu  (1962)
  Parash Pathar   (1958)
  Ekti Raat  (1956)
  Naba Bidhan  (1954)
  Louha Kapat  (1958)
  Sagarika (1956)
  Sabar Upare  (1955)
  Hospital  (1960)
  Jamalaye Jibanta Manush   (1958)
  Suryatoran  (1958)
  Ashite Ashiona  (1967)
  Bibhas  (1964)
  Bhanu Pelo Lottery  (1958)
  Deya Neya  (1964)
  Thana Theke Aschi   (1965)
  Sesh Anka  (1963)
  Chirodiner  (1969)
  Barnali  (1963) 
   Parineeta  (1969) 
  Kaal Tumi Aaleya (1966) 
  Monihaar  (1966) 
  Jeeban Mrityu  (1967) 
  Sabarmati  (1969) 
  Pitaputra  (1969) 
  Teen Bhubaner Paare  (1969) 
  Harmonium  (1976) 
  Phulu Takurma  (1974) 
  Raudrachhaya  (1973) 
  Aaro Ekjon  (1980) 
  Asadharan  (1976) 
  Daksha Yagna  (1980)
 Khelar Putul (1981)

References

External links
 

1912 births
1993 deaths